John Hibbert may refer to:
 Sir J. T. Hibbert (John Tomlinson Hibbert), British barrister and politician
 John Wayne Hibbert, English boxer 
 John Hibbert (cricketer), English cricketer and banker
 John Hibbert, co-founder of Bethel Church, Mansfield Woodhouse, a Christian religious organisation